Nicanor de Carvalho Júnior, sometimes simply known as Nicanor (9 February 1947 – 28 November 2018), was a Brazilian football manager.

Nicanor de Carvalho managed several Brazilian clubs during the 1980s and 1990s, including Guarani Futebol Clube. He died on 28 November 2018 at the age of 71.

Managerial statistics

Honors
J. League Manager of the Year - 1997

References

External links
NASL career stats

1947 births
2018 deaths
Brazilian football managers
Expatriate football managers in Japan
J1 League managers
Sport Club Corinthians Paulista managers
Associação Atlética Internacional (Limeira) managers
Paulista Futebol Clube managers
Club Athletico Paranaense managers
Coritiba Foot Ball Club managers
São José Esporte Clube managers
Associação Atlética Ponte Preta managers
Santos FC managers
Guarani FC managers
Shonan Bellmare managers
Kashiwa Reysol managers
Tokyo Verdy managers
América Futebol Clube (SP) managers
Botafogo Futebol Clube (SP) managers
Rio Branco Esporte Clube managers
Brazilian footballers
Brazilian expatriates in Japan
Association footballers not categorized by position
People from Leme, São Paulo